The Hindoo Dagger is a 1909 American Short film and Mystery Drama directed by D. W. Griffith and the film was made by the American Mutoscope and Biograph Company.

Cast
 Harry Solter as Jack Windom
 Marion Leonard as The Woman
 Arthur V. Johnson as Tom
 Robert Harron as Messenger
 John R. Cumpson as The Doctor
 George Gebhardt The Second Lover

See also
 List of American films of 1909
 D. W. Griffith filmography

References

External links

1909 films
American mystery drama films
1900s mystery drama films
American silent short films
Films directed by D. W. Griffith
1909 short films
American black-and-white films
1900s American films
Silent American drama films
Silent mystery drama films